Alexander Ian Grant (born 23 January 1994) is an Australian footballer who plays as a defender for K League 1 club Pohang Steelers.

Career

Portsmouth
Grant signed a two-year scholarship with Portsmouth in July 2010. He progressed through reserve and academy sides, and appeared on the bench against Nottingham Forest, on 28 April 2012.
In his next season, on 14 August, he made his professional debut, acting as a starter in a Football League Cup match against Plymouth Argyle.

On 20 December, he was loaned to Eastleigh in a one-month deal. He made his debut on New Year's Day, against Salisbury.

On 24 January 2013, he joined Havant & Waterlooville on a one-month loan deal. He joined Hawks as a replacement for fellow Portsmouth player Dan Butler, who gained first team action at Pompey. He made his Hawks debut two days later, in a 0–0 away draw against Dorchester Town. He scored his first goal for Hawks on 16 April, against Dover Athletic.

Stoke City
On 9 May, despite his loan being successful, he was released by Pompey. Following his release by Portsmouth, Grant signed for Stoke City who fought off competition from Everton. On 30 August 2014 Grant joined Macclesfield Town on loan. He scored his first goal for the Silkmen in an FA Cup tie against Wrexham. Grant was released by Stoke at the end of the 2014–15 season.

Perth Glory
Grant returned to Australia in June 2015 and joined A-League side Perth Glory.

Pohang Steelers
In December 2020, with 3 seasons left on his Perth Glory contract, Grant joined Pohang Steelers on an undisclosed fee transfer.

International career
Despite being born in England, Grant was called to play for Australia U17. He was on the provisional 35-man squad for the 2011 FIFA U-17 World Cup.

Career statistics

Honours
Perth Glory
 A-League: Premiers 2018–19 
 AFC Champions League runner-up: 2021

References

External links

	

1994 births
Living people
Footballers from Manchester
English footballers
Australian soccer players
Association football defenders
Portsmouth F.C. players
Eastleigh F.C. players
Havant & Waterlooville F.C. players
Stoke City F.C. players
Macclesfield Town F.C. players
Perth Glory FC players
Pohang Steelers players
National League (English football) players
A-League Men players